Ulaanbaatar Metro is a rapid transit system in the planning stages in Ulaanbaatar, Mongolia. The Ulaanbaatar Metro project was approved in 2012, and construction was originally planned to be completed by 2020, however, as of 2023 it is still not open.

History 

The exact date of the initial studies on the project is unknown. Serious planning began in the early 2000s, when the city's population surpassed one million.  In 2010, the population of Ulaanbaatar was 1,240,037 inhabitants and is increasing by nearly 100,000 people a year. The transport problem is exacerbated by the harsh climate and long winters. Traffic movement is difficult because of congestion, and the air is heavily polluted by exhaust fumes.

The decision was made at the end of 2011 to begin construction of a rail system.  The project was intended to be financed by loans, by Japanese and other international capital. In 2015, construction was postponed. In 2018 planning was resumed, and the cost was then expected to be around $1.5 billion.

See also 
Ulaanbaatar Railbus

References 

Ulaanbaatar
Rapid transit in Mongolia
Underground rapid transit in Mongolia
Proposed public transport in Asia
Rail infrastructure in Mongolia
Proposed transport infrastructure in Mongolia
Proposed rapid transit
Rapid transit systems under construction

ru:Улан-Баторская городская железная дорога#Проект строительства Улан-Баторского метрополитена